The Honda S series is a series of convertible sports cars by Honda.
1962 Honda S360
1963 Honda S500
1964–1966 Honda S600
1966–1970 Honda S800
1999–2009 Honda S2000
2015–2022 Honda S660

S